Valiasr (also Romanized as Valī‘aşr) is a village in Tasuj Rural District, in the Central District of Kavar County, Fars Province, Iran. At the 2006 census, its population was 1,344, in 267 families.

References 

Populated places in Kavar County